Electric Forest is a  multi-genre music festival produced by Madison House Presents and Insomniac Events with a focus on electronic music and jam band genres.  Original  named Rothbury Festival in 2008, it is held in Rothbury, Michigan at the Double JJ Resort.   In 2017, Electric Forest was nominated for Festival of the Year at the Electronic Music Awards. The event was not held in 2020 or 2021 due to the COVID-19 pandemic.

2008
The Rothbury Music Festival took place on July 3–6. The first year saw 30,202 in attendance. This figure is based on Madison House's promise that US$2 per ticket sold would go towards Grant Township. According to the Muskegon Chronicle, the festival donated $60,404 to Grant Township.

Planning
On February 13, 2008, the initial lineup was released. By February 25, four additional artists were added. Steel Pulse was added on March 13, and seven artists were added in April. On May 29, the lineup was complete after six additional artists were added, including Trey Anastasio of Phish.

The spark of the idea came from Philip Blaine and Jeremy Stein, on the side of the stage, during Crystal Method at Rothbury.  Then Phil brought this vision to Insomniac. From there, Electric Forest came into existence.

Lineup

July 3

Greensky Bluegrass
Zappa Plays Zappa
Disco Biscuits
Kyle Hollingsworth Band
Perpetual Groove
Mickey Hart Band (featuring Steve Kimock and George Porter Jr.)
Railroad Earth
Underground Orchestra
The Juan MacLean
Lotus
EOTO
Motion Potion
DJ Rootz
DJ Cuntlicker

July 4

The Dynamites (Charles Walker)
The Wailers (featuring Elan Atias)
Snoop Dogg
311
Widespread Panic
The Beautiful Girls
Tea Leaf Green
Sam Beam
Keller Williams & The WMD's
Yonder Mountain String Band (with Jon Fishman)
of Montreal
Primus
Jakob Dylan & The Gold Mountain Rebels
Panjea (with Michael Kang)
Bettye LaVette
Drive-By Truckers
Modest Mouse
Thievery Corporation
Bassnectar
Sage Francis
Flosstradamus
Diplo
Pnuma Trio
Fiction Plane
DJ Rootz
Motion Potion
SOJOURN

July 5

Four Finger Five
State Radio
Citizen Cope
Michael Franti & Spearhead
Dave Matthews Band (with Tim Reynolds)
Dead Confederate
The Secret Machines
Gomez
The Black Keys
Slightly Stoopid
STS9
Trampled By Turtles
Emmitt Nershi Band
The Dresden Dolls
Medeski Martin & Wood
Derek Trucks & Susan Tedeschi Soul Stew Revival
A3
The Crystal Method DJ Set
BoomBox
Busdriver
DJ Harry
DJ Rekha
Kraak & Smaak
Sweet Japonic
Uncle Boogie Pants
DJ Rootz
Motion Potion

July 6

Steel Pulse
Rodrigo y Gabriela
Trey Anastasio
Gov't Mule
Phil Lesh and Friends
Brett Dennen
MOFRO
Colbie Caillat
John Mayer
Ingrid Michaelson
Taj Mahal
Beth Orton
Mike Gordon
Atmosphere with Brother Ali
Adam Ezra Group
Amanda Palmer
Pnuma Live PA
BoomBox

Additional performers
The following performers played throughout the weekend:

Etown Radio Show
The Greyboy Allstars
The Stretch
Sxip Shirey
Yard Dogs Road Show

Notable collaborations
Several members were present from their respective bands: The String Cheese Incident, Phish, Grateful Dead, and The Allman Brothers Band. Following the addition of the Kyle Hollingsworth Band to the lineup, all six members of The String Cheese Incident were present in separate bands: Bill Nershi played with the Emmitt Nershi Band, EOTO is composed of Jason Hann and Michael Travis, Keith Moseley played in the WMD's who accompanied Keller Williams, and Michael Kang played with Panjea. Three of the four members of Phish were present: Mike Gordon, Jon Fishman, and Trey Anastasio. Phil Lesh and Mickey Hart, of Grateful Dead fame, also performed in their respective bands. Two of the current members of the Allman Brothers Band, Warren Haynes of Gov't Mule and Derek Trucks, performed in distinct bands.

David Murphy, of STS9, joined the stage with the Disco Biscuits during their Thursday night set.

2009
The Rothbury Music Festival (not the Electric Forest Festival) officially returned in 2009. The second Rothbury was held July 2–5, over Independence Day weekend. The festival's second year expanded the think-tank discussions established the first year and continued the use of sustainable technologies.

Controversy
Because of concerns over the ownership of the ranch, as well as the potential sale of the festival grounds, there was originally uncertainty about whether a second festival would be held in 2009. A major hurdle was overcome when a federal bankruptcy judge cleared the way for a lease of the festival property between the bankruptcy trustee and AEG. A second hearing was necessary to determine if the lease was valid, because part of the land used by the festival was on a sheriff's deed and needed to be purchased by the trustee. Following the approval of this final hearing, WZZM reported the festival would return in 2009.

Lineup
Before the official lineup was released, there were rumors of artists such as Phish and Tom Petty performing, but this never occurred.

July 2

Fox Rocks Winner
Toubab Krew
Davy Knowles & Back Door Slam
Keller Williams
Quannum Allstars
Lotus
Future Rock
The Cool Kids
The Disco Biscuits
Cold War Kids
Break Science ft. Adam Deitch
 Tom Butwin Band

July 3

King Sunny Adé & His African Beats
Brett Dennen
Steppin' In It
Rachel Goodrich
Rebelution
Martin Sexton
G. Love & Special Sauce
Broken Social Scene
Femi Kuti & The Positive Force
The White Buffalo
Damian Marley & Nas
Flogging Molly
Soulive
The String Cheese Incident
STS9
Chromeo
Lynx & Janover
Girl Talk
Lipp Service
The Glitch Mob
The Macpodz
Tom Butwin Band

July 4

Ralph Stanley & The Clinch Mountain Boys
Four Finger Five
Giant Panda Guerilla Dub Squad
Son Volt
Jackie Greene
Underground Orchestra
Wendy Darling
Hill Country Revue
Railroad Earth
John Butler
Zappa Plays Zappa
Les Claypool
Reed Thomas Lawrence
The Dead
Umphrey's McGee
MSTRKRFT
Pretty Lights
STS9 (Live PA Set)
Shpongle DJ Set
EOTO

July 5

The Ragbirds
The Hard Lessons
Peter Rowan Bluegrass Band with Tony Rice
Toots and the Maytals
Sam Roberts Band
Guster
Chris Pierce
Yonder Mountain String Band
Govt' Mule
The Hold Steady
Matisyahu
The Parlor Mob
Ani DiFranco
Grace Potter and the Nocturnals
 Ralston Bowles – folk musician
Bob Dylan & His Band
Umphrey's McGee Nightcap
Alex B (Pnuma Trio)
Willie Nelson and Family
Big Gigantic

2010
According to an announcement made on Rothbury's official website on January 22, the festival would be "on hiatus" in 2010, but was expected to return in 2011.

2011 -- Electric Forest begins
Electric Forest was co-founded by Pasquale Rotella, Founder and CEO of Insomniac, and Madison House Presents' Jeremy Stein, CEO. It was not "Rothbury Festival", a trademarked name. A notable change was the lack of the main "Odium" stage. In its absence "The Ranch Arena" stage became the main stage. The area where the Odium had been was not accessible to festival attendees again until 2015.  From June 30 to July 3, a new and different festival was held on the same festival grounds, the "Electric Forest Festival". From Electric Forest's inception in 2011 until 2016 The String Cheese Incident acted as the host band, performing three shows each year (more than any other performer).

Lineup 
The lineup included

2012
Electric Forest Festival returned to Rothbury from June 28 to July 1. Acts included

2013
Electric Forest Festival returned to Rothbury in 2013 from June 27 through June 30.

Lineup
The initial lineup, announced on February 5, included:

2014
Electric Forest Festival was held on June 26–29, and sold out for the first time.

Lineup
The lineup included:

2015

2016
Electric Forest Festival was held on June 23–26, 2016.

Lineup
The lineup headliners included:

2017
For the first time, the Electric Forest Festival was held on two weekends: June 22–25 and June 29 – July 2, 2017.

Lineup
The lineup for both weekends included:

Artists appearing in Weekend 1 only

Artists appearing in Weekend 2 only

2018
In 2018, Electric Forest took place across two weekends: June 21–24 and June 28 – July 1.

Lineup
The lineup for both weekends included:

2019
In 2019, Electric Forest reverted to a single weekend festival, and was held June 27–30, 2019.

Lineup
The lineup for 2019 included:

2020
Due to the COVID-19 pandemic, in the Spring of 2020, Electric Forest considered rescheduling the event for September 2020. The Rothbury Village Council voted to reject the proposed postponement, leading to the complete cancellation of Electric Forest 2020, which will instead return Summer 2022.

2022
June 23–26, 2022 Rothbury, Michigan

Lineup

See also
List of electronic music festivals
List of jam band music festivals

References

External links

Electric Forest Official Website
About the festival in Russian

Music festivals established in 2008
Music festivals in Michigan
Rock festivals in the United States
Tourist attractions in Oceana County, Michigan
Electronic music festivals in the United States
Jam band festivals
2008 establishments in Michigan